Kigoma is an administrative ward in Kigoma-Ujiji District of Kigoma Region in Tanzania. 
In 2016 the Tanzania National Bureau of Statistics report there were 7,604 people in the ward, from 6,908 in 2012.

Villages / neighborhoods 
The ward has 4 neighborhoods.
 Katonga
 Lumumba
 Mji Mwema
 Shede

References

Wards of Kigoma Region